Salvia nubigena is a perennial undershrub endemic to a very small region in the Rio Concavo Valley in Colombia.

Notes

nubigena
Endemic flora of Colombia